Zinc laurate is an metal-organic compound with the chemical formula . It is classified as a metallic soap, i.e. a metal derivative of a fatty acid (lauric acid).

Physical properties
Zinc laurate forms a white powder, has a slightly waxy odor.

Insoluble in water.

Use
Zinc laurate is used in the personal care and cosmetics industry as an anticaking agent, dry binder, viscosity increasing agent.

References

Laurates
Zinc compounds